Vidovci is a village in Požega-Slavonia County, Croatia. The village is administered as a part of the City of Požega. According to the 2011 national census of 2011, the population of the village is 1,582. It is connected by the D38 state road.

Sources

Populated places in Požega-Slavonia County